Swedish singer and actress Helen Sjöholm made her first major recording in 1995/1996, when she played the role in Benny Andersson's and Björn Ulvaeus's epic musical Kristina från Duvemåla. Since then, she has contributed to many album recordings. However, only two solo-albums under her own name have been released in 2002 and 2010.

This discography provides a summary of her work from 1995 until today. Albums which feature important contributions by her can be found in the albums section, whereas other collaborations and contributions are listed in the section below.

While not being able to score many hit-singles on the official Swedish Singles Chart, which is based on sales, she nevertheless is responsible for a string of hits on the important Swedish radio chart Svensktoppen. She even holds the record for the longest chart run (278 weeks) and longest consecutive occupation of the number 1 spot (38 weeks, 65 weeks in total) on that chart with the Benny Anderssons Orkester song Du är min man.

Albums

Other contributions

Singles

See also
Benny Anderssons Orkester
Benny Andersson discography
Kristina från Duvemåla
Chess

References

External links
 Unofficial Helen Sjöholm homepage

Swedish women singers
Discographies of Swedish artists